Cigaritis homeyeri, the Homeyer's bar or Homeyer's silverline, is a lycaenid butterfly that is native to the Afrotropics. Adults are on wing year-round with distinct wet- and dry-season forms.

Range
It is found in Cameroon, Gabon, the Republic of the Congo, Angola, the Democratic Republic of the Congo (Kinshasa, Equateur, Lualaba, Lomami, Shaba and Maniema), Uganda, Kenya, Tanzania, Malawi, Zambia, Zimbabwe, Mozambique and Namibia.

Habitat and food plants
The habitat consists of grassy savannah. The larvae feed on Acacia species.

Etymology
The name honours Alexander von Homeyer.

References

External links
Die Gross-Schmetterlinge der Erde 13: Die Afrikanischen Tagfalter. Plate XIII 69 f

Butterflies described in 1887
Cigaritis
Butterflies of Africa
Taxa named by Hermann Dewitz